Aiolopus puissanti is a species of band-winged grasshopper in the family Acrididae. It is found in southern Europe and northern Africa.

References

External links

 

Oedipodinae